The Old South Meeting House is a historic Congregational church building located at the corner of Milk and Washington Streets in the Downtown Crossing area of Boston, Massachusetts, built in 1729. It gained fame as the organizing point for the Boston Tea Party on December 16, 1773. Five thousand or more colonists gathered at the Meeting House, the largest building in Boston at the time.

History

Church (1729–1872)
The meeting house or church was completed in 1729, with its 56 m (183 ft) steeple. The congregation was gathered in 1669 when it broke off from First Church of Boston, a Congregational church founded by John Winthrop in 1630. The site was a gift of Mrs. Norton, widow of John Norton, pastor of the First Church in Boston. The church's first pastor was Rev. Thomas Thacher, a native of Salisbury, England. Thacher was also a physician and is known for publishing the first medical tract in Massachusetts.

After the Boston Massacre in 1770, yearly anniversary meetings were held at the church until 1775, featuring speakers such as John Hancock and Dr. Joseph Warren. In 1773, 5,000 people met in the Meeting House to debate British taxation and, after the meeting, a group raided three tea ships anchored nearby in what became known as the Boston Tea Party.

In October 1775, led by Lt Col Samuel Birch of the 17th Dragoons, the British occupied the Meeting House due to its association with the Revolutionary cause. They gutted the building, filled it with dirt, and then used the interior to practice horse riding. They destroyed much of the interior and stole various items, including William Bradford's Of Plymouth Plantation (1620), a unique Pilgrim manuscript hidden in Old South's tower.  After the British evacuated Boston, the plan for rebuilding the interior of the church was drawn by Thomas Dawes.

Old South Meeting House was almost destroyed in the Great Boston Fire of 1872, saved by the timely arrival of a fire engine from Portsmouth, New Hampshire, but the fire caused the city's residential districts to shift toward the Back Bay, away from the church.  The congregation then built a new church building (the "New" Old South Church at Copley Square) which remains its home to this day. The Old South congregation returns to Old South Meeting House for services in its ancestral home once a year, on the Sunday before Thanksgiving.

Ministers
 Thomas Thacher (1620–1678), minister 1670–1678
 Samuel Willard (1640–1707), minister 1678–1707
 Ebenezer Pemberton (1671–1717), minister 1700–1717
 Joseph Sewall (1688–1769), minister 1713–1769
 Thomas Prince (1687–1758), minister 1718–1758
 Alexander Cumming (1726–1763), minister 1761–1763
 Samuel Blair (1741–1818), minister 1766-1769
 John Bacon (b.1737), minister 1772–1775
 Joseph Eckley (1750–1811), minister 1779–1811
 Joshua Huntington (1786–1819), minister 1808–1819
 Benjamin B. Wisner (1794–1835), minister 1821–1832
 Samuel H. Stearns (1801–1837), minister 1834–1836
 George W. Blagden (1802–1884), minister 1836–1872
 Jacob M. Manning (1824–1882), minister 1857–1872

Notable congregants
John Alden
John Alden Jr.
 Judith Quincy Hull
 Hannah Quincy Hull (Sewall) 
John Hull
Daniel Quincy
Samuel Adams
William Dawes
Benjamin Franklin
Samuel Sewall
Phillis Wheatley

Museum (1877–present)
Old South Meeting House has been an important gathering place for nearly three centuries. Renowned for the protest meetings held here before the American Revolution when the building was termed a mouth-house, this National Historic Landmark has long served as a platform for the free expression of ideas. Today, the Old South Meeting House is open daily as a museum and continues to provide a place for people to meet, discuss and act on important issues of the day. The stories of the men and women who are part of Old South's vital heritage reveal why the Old South Meeting House occupies an enduring place in the history of the United States.

The museum and historic site is located at the intersection of Washington and Milk Streets and can be visited for a nominal sum. It is located near the State Street, Downtown Crossing and Park Street MBTA (subway) stations.

The Old South Meeting House is claimed to be the second oldest establishment existent in the United States. It is currently under consideration for local landmark status by the Boston Landmarks Commission.

In 2020 the former caretaker of Old South Meeting House (the Old South Association in Boston) merged with the Bostonian Society, forming Revolutionary Spaces, which now manages both Old South Meeting House and the Old State House.

Gallery

See also
 New Old South Church, Copley Square, Back Bay, Boston
 List of National Historic Landmarks in Boston
 National Register of Historic Places listings in northern Boston, Massachusetts

References
Notes

Further reading
 B. Wisner. History of the Old South Church in Boston: in four sermons. 1830.
 Hamilton Andrews Hill. History of the Old South Church (Third Church) Boston: 1669–1884. v.1 +  v.2. Houghton, Mifflin and Co., 1889.

External links 

 The Old South Meeting House
 Old South Church in Boston (the congregation formerly located at the Meeting House)
 Boston National Historical Park Official Website
 Historic American Buildings Survey (Library of Congress). Old South Meetinghouse, Washington & Milk Streets, Boston, Suffolk, MA
 The Diaries of John Hull, Mint-master and Treasurer of the Colony of Massachusetts Bay

Landmarks in Financial District, Boston
Museums in Boston
National Historic Landmarks in Boston
Churches on the National Register of Historic Places in Massachusetts
Towers in Massachusetts
Churches in Boston
Churches completed in 1729
History museums in Massachusetts
Boston National Historical Park
18th-century churches in the United States
1729 establishments in Massachusetts
National Register of Historic Places in Boston